Apantesis behrii is a moth of the family Erebidae. It was described by Stretch in 1872. It is found from Oregon south to California. It is most common in the Siskiyou and Sierra Nevada ranges. The habitat consists of dry lithosol flood plains and balds in the mountains.

The moth is about 34 mm. The forewings are black, with a pattern of bright ochreous yellow bands. The hindwings are saturated orange-pink, but sometimes yellow. There are two to three dark postmedial spots and some marginal black marks. Adults are on wing from early August to late September.

The larvae feed on Lotus humistratus and Amsinckia species.

This species was formerly a member of the genus Grammia, but was moved to Apantesis along with the other species of the genera Grammia, Holarctia, and Notarctia.

References

 Natural History Museum Lepidoptera generic names catalog

Arctiina
Moths described in 1872